Anund, English exonym Anwynd, may refer to:

 Anund, Bröt-Anund, legendary Swea ruler
 Anund Uppsale, legendary Swea ruler
 Anund Jacob, Swedish king
 Anund Gårdske, Anund the Russian, Swedish king